"Superduperman" is a satirical story by Harvey Kurtzman and Wally Wood that was published in the fourth issue of Mad (April–May 1953). Lampooning both Superman and Captain Marvel, it revolutionized the types of stories seen in Mad, leading to greatly improved sales. Writers such as Alan Moore have cited this story as an influence.

Characters and story
The plot parallels the Superman scenario of the period: "Clark Bent" is a lowly assistant to the copy boy at The Daily Dirt newspaper, where he tries, unsuccessfully, to woo the disgusted "Lois Pain". Meanwhile, an 'unknown monster' is stalking the streets of the city. Bent changes into Superduperman to help save the day, but "boy reporter Billy Spafon" reveals himself to be the monster, "Captain Marbles".  Superduperman is unable to harm Captain Marbles until he provokes Marbles into punching himself in the head. Hoping this victory will be enough to sway Pain, he reveals his alter ego, only to be rejected again; the story closes with Pain's putdown: "Once a creep, always a creep".

Kurtzman's script subverts the admirable image of the superhero. Clark Bent uses his X-ray vision to peer into the women's bathroom, and Captain Marbles has abandoned good deeds for the pursuit of money. The conflict between the two characters also parodies the National Comics Publications v. Fawcett Publications trial.

Reception
Until Mad #4, the magazine had not been one of EC's top-selling titles, but "Superduperman" revolutionized their format and led to sales success. In his book Comics, Manga, and Graphic Novels: A History of Graphic Narratives, Robert Petersen observes: "In April 1953, Mad #4 included a parody of Superman, 'Superduperman', which originated a new formula that would significantly raise the popularity of the new magazine. Instead of broadly lampooning a genre of comics, 'Superduperman' levelled its sights on a specific and recognizable comic character". National, the owners of Superman's copyright, threatened to file a lawsuit over the parody. EC and National shared the same lawyer, who advised Gaines to quit publishing parodies. While Gaines was weighing this advice, Kurtzman located a legal precedent that backed his and Mad'''s right to publish. Gaines hired the author of that precedent to write a brief substantiating EC's position, but the companies' shared lawyer disagreed, siding with National over EC. Gaines consulted a third lawyer, who advised Gaines to simply ignore the threat and continue publishing parodies. National never filed suit, and this legal cover establishing the basis for Kurtzman's new editorial direction became the bedrock of Mad's humor.

After the eponymous eight-page story in Mad #4, the character made a cameo appearance in the comic's "Popeye" parody, "Poopeye" (Mad #21). In 1968, Mad and DC Comics became part of the same corporate conglomerate, but this did not prevent the magazine from publishing spoofs of the Superman film series, including Superduperman (Mad #208, July 1979), Superduperman II (Mad #226, October 1981), and Stuporman ZZZ (Mad #243, December 1983).

Influences
The story was an influence on Alan Moore when creating Watchmen. Moore has said: "We wanted to take Superduperman 180 degrees – dramatic, instead of comedic", but it also influenced the art: "I think that we probably settled upon the kind of Wally Wood 'Superduperman' style. You know, super-heroics, lots of details, heavy blacks, of a distinctive style". When asked about the influence of Superfolks on his work like the earlier Marvelman, Moore said: "I'd still say that Harvey Kurtzman's Superduperman probably had the preliminary influence". He went into more detail in Kimota! the Miracleman Companion:

The story would also influence John Shelton Lawrence. As a child he dressed as a superhero and got himself into trouble but "[h]is understanding of superpowers matured, however, when he read Mad Magazine's' "Superduperman" in the early 1950s. That teenage skepticism grew into a philosophical teaching career, resulting in his current position as a professor of philosophy, emeritus, at Morningside College in Iowa. With Robert Jewert, he developed his suspicion that America's righteous stance in the world often projects the story of the selfless crusader who can cleanly use superpowers to rescue the innocent". These ideas would be expanded in their books The American Monomyth (1977), The Myth of the American Superhero (2002), and Captain America and the Crusade Against Evil: The Dilemma of Zealous Nationalism (2003).

In 1956, Ernie Kovacs did a Superclod sketch parody that had some similarities to Kurtzman's version; Kovacs was also a contributor to Mad Magazine.

That same year, Warner Bros. released their own parody, Stupor Duck, which was another in a series of cartoons depicting Daffy Duck doing a parody of another character.  The story has "Cluck Trent" squaring off against supervillain "Aardvark Ratnik," although neither Cluck Trent nor Stupor Duck are aware that Ratnik is merely a character in a TV show.

Don Glut made, and starred in, a Superduperman'' fan film in 1963.

See also
 History of Mad
 Wonder Wart-Hog, another Superman parody

Notes

References

External links
 
 
 Superduperman at Comic Vine

Characters created by Wally Wood
Comics by Harvey Kurtzman
Comics characters introduced in 1953
Comics superheroes
Mad (magazine)
Metafictional comics
Parody superheroes
Parody comics
Satirical comics
Male characters in comics
Parodies of Superman
Captain Marvel (DC Comics)